Charles Samoy (born 30 April 1939) is a former French football player and manager. As a player, Samoy played for AC Denain, CO Roubaix-Tourcoing, Le Havre and Lille, and participated in the 1960 Summer Olympics. As a manager, he enjoyed two spells in charge of Lille, from 1976 to 1977 and in 1997.

References

External links
Player profile at FIFA

1939 births
Living people
Association football goalkeepers
French footballers
CO Roubaix-Tourcoing players
Le Havre AC players
Lille OSC players
Ligue 1 players
Olympic footballers of France
France international footballers
Footballers at the 1952 Summer Olympics
Footballers at the 1960 Summer Olympics
French football managers
Lille OSC managers
Ligue 1 managers